The Interagency Volcanic Event Notification Plan (IVENP) is a program in Canada established to outline the notification procedure of some of the main agencies that would be involved in response to a volcanic eruption in Canada, an eruption close to Canada's borders, or significant enough that a volcanic eruption will have an effect on Canada and its people. The main hazards posed to Canada from volcanic eruptions is from volcanic ash.

Agencies and associations
Agencies and associations associated with the Interagency Volcanic Event Notification Plan include:
Air Canada Pilots Association
Air Line Pilots Association, International
Provincial Emergency Program
Environment Canada
Natural Resources Canada
Nav Canada
Public Safety Canada
Royal Canadian Mounted Police
Transport Canada
Yukon Emergency Measures Organization

See also
Volcanism in Canada

References

Volcanism of Canada
Emergency population warning systems in Canada